Mount Darwin is a mountain located in the West Coast region of Tasmania, Australia.

On the eastern side of the mountain is Darwin, a long-abandoned town site. Mount Darwin is the southernmost mountain of the West Coast range. Mount Jukes is north of the mountain while Mount Sorell is west of it.

The mountain is named in honour of Charles Darwin.

Mine sites
Long abandoned short drives and shallow holes are found on Mount Darwin and are usually cited as being part of the Jukes-Darwin field.

Features and access

The mountain has a plateau and has mining exploration tracks that lead to some of the older workings. It was possible in the 1970s to travel to the top of Mount Darwin in four wheel drive vehicles. The tracks also lead over towards the Clark River Valley which lies between Darwin and Mount Sorell to the west, and some tracks also were made on the ridge between Mount Darwin and the southern side of Mount Jukes.

Additional features located adjacent to the mountain includes a series of valleys and depressions called respectively the East Darwin Cirque, the South Darwin Cirque, and the Darwin Crater, a probable impact crater, lying  to the south-east of the mountain; the South Darwin Peak, a hill; and the Darwin Plateau.

See also

 Darwin glass
 List of highest mountains of Tasmania

References

Further reading

External links 
 West Coast Range on Google Maps
 https://web.archive.org/web/20070907132410/http://www.parks.tas.gov.au/wha/wherein/detail.html - context of World Heritage Area
 http://www.nla.gov.au/apps/cdview?pi=nla.pic-vn3991445-s2  1958 photo from the east, including Mount Sorell's eastern slopes

Darwin, Mount
Darwin, Mount